Eucalyptus alaticaulis, commonly known as the Grampians grey-gum, is a tree or mallee that is endemic to a restricted area in the  Grampians National Park in Australia. It has rough, fibrous bark near the base of its trunk, lance-shaped leaves, groups of about seven cylindrical buds with a cone-shaped operculum, white flowers and more or less cylindrical fruit.

Description
They are the same colour on both surfaces. The buds are more or less cylindrical with a conical operculum and the flowers are white.

This species was previously included in E. cypellocarpa but is shorter, has persistent bark and broader juvenile leaves.

Taxonomy
Eucalyptus alaticaulis was first formally described in 1987 by R.J.Watson and Pauline Y. Ladiges and the description was published in the journal Brunonia. The specific epithet (alaticaulis) is derived from the Latin words alatus meaning "winged", and caulis meaning "stem" or "stalk".

Distribution and habitat
The Grampians grey-gum is restricted to dry rocky slopes in the Grampian Ranges.

References

Flora of Victoria (Australia)
Trees of Australia
alaticaulis
Myrtales of Australia
Plants described in 1987